The Strange Night is a 1967 Italian film directed by Alfredo Angeli. It was entered into the 17th Berlin International Film Festival.

Cast
 Sandra Milo as Debora
 Enrico Maria Salerno
 Giulio Platone
 Lidia Alfonsi
 Massimo Serato
 Evi Maltagliati
 Ettore Manni
 Antonella Steni
 Giorgio Capecchi
 Elvira Cortese
 Annie Gorassini
 Adriano Micantoni
 Mirella Pamphili

References

External links

1967 films
1960s Italian-language films
Italian black-and-white films
Films scored by Benedetto Ghiglia
Films set in Rome
1960s Italian films